Bolyaran is a very small  village in Gülnar district of  Mersin Province, Turkey. It is situated to the west of a turpentine tree forest. The population of Bolyaran was only 20 as of 2012.

References

Villages in Gülnar District